Taregana or Taregna (literally, Counting Stars),  is a small town near Masaurhi in Patna district, Bihar, India.

History
In Taregna, Aryabhata set up an astronomical observatory in the Sun Temple 6th century. It is believed that here he proposed the Heliocentric Model.

Geography
Taregna is located at Average elevation from sea level at 61 meters as per Google Earth.
It is close to Patna and the Jahanabad too. You can get here by train (Local trains, usually called PG passenger trains i.e. Patna Gaya) or by the road from Patna which goes to Gaya.

Demographics
Taregna is a small town now growing at a fast pace. There are many people coming to get settled here permanently. There must be over 10,000 people here. It has some good markets that attracts all the villager that are close to it Lawaich, Lasgarichak, pathrahat, Bela, Jagidishpur to name some. It has a famous temple called the 'Manichack' which witnesses over 5,000 of marriages every year. People of Taregana are very friendly & helpful. Taregna comes under Masaurhi Sub-division (अनुमंडल).

Transport
Taregna railway station is situated in Masaurhi sub-division, which is a township of Patna district, is named after Taregna. Village has railway station on Patna–Gaya line (Station Code - TEA) is well connected to nearby cities like Patna through railway. Daily, a huge number workers and government officers travel to the capital by the local trains. So in PG local passenger trains we can see a large people from Masaurhi. So in the midst there was a demand for increasing the frequency of these local trains.

22 July 2009 solar eclipse

Taregna experienced a sudden load of visitors coming to the village to see the solar eclipse of July 22, 2009, as, according to various sources, it will be one of the best locations within the path of totality to watch the solar eclipse. It was reported that the solar eclipse should be visible for at least three minutes and 38 seconds from Taregana. However, the maximum duration of the eclipse will be six minutes 38 seconds in the Pacific Ocean. However, on 22 July the eclipse was obscured by heavy cloud cover.

References

Tourist attractions in Bihar
Cities and towns in Patna district